Harpalus foveiger is a species of ground beetle in the subfamily Harpalinae. It was described by Tschitscherine in 1895.

References

foveiger
Beetles described in 1895